Hamza Dirani حمزة ديراني (born in Amman, August 16, 1982) is a Jordanian race car and kart racing driver. In addition to competing successfully in karting in Jordan, Lebanon, Dubai and Egypt, in 2005, he joined Meritus Racing to race in the Formula BMW Asia racing series and be the first Jordanian to participate in Formula Racing. He finished all his races in the top ten. He is also an entrepreneur, having established his own karting business in 2006.

Racing career highlights 

In 2005, Dirani joined formula racing, participating in several rounds of the Formula BMW Asia championship and finishing in the top ten. He also drove as a guest by invitation in the Formula Ford Championship at the Bahrain International Circuit. He has also continued successfully competing in karting, taking 3rd in the 2008 Middle East Karting Championship.

Business
In 2006, Dirani became the national official representative of Tony Kart. In 2007, he opened his own company Jordan Karting and organized the first Tony Kart Ramadan Challenge.

Now, Jordan Karting is the leader in the karting field in Jordan and became the official dealer for many brands, such as Birel, OMP, Rotax and many more.

Below is a list of races organized by Jordan Karting

Karting School

Here are some results of drivers sponsored and trained by Dirani before and during the Dirani Karting School

External links
Official Website

Jordanian racing drivers
1982 births
Living people
Sportspeople from Amman
Formula Ford drivers
Formula BMW Asia drivers
Team Meritus drivers